The departments of Guatemala are divided into 340 municipalities, or municipios. The municipalities are listed below, by department.

List

References

 
Subdivisions of Guatemala
Guatemala, Municipalities
Guatemala 2
Municipalities, Guatemala
Guatemala geography-related lists